In hip hop music, political hip hop, or political rap, is a form developed in the 1980s, inspired by 1970s political preachers such as The Last Poets and Gil Scott-Heron. Public Enemy were the first political hip hop group to gain commercial success. Grandmaster Flash and the Furious Five released the first sociopolitical rap song in 1982, named “The Message”, which inspired many rappers to address social and political topics.

List

See also 
Hip hop activism

References 

Political hip hop artists